Christopher James Childs (born 24 June 1959) is an English bass player who is a member of the hard rock band Thunder since 1996.

Born in the Essex village of Writtle, Chris Childs joined Thunder in November 1996, replacing Mikael Höglund, and has previously played with artists such as Paul Young, Andy Summers, Colin Blunstone, Then Jerico, Waterfront, Never The Bride and Go West.
He also plays bass with Russ Ballard and The Don Airey Band, and tours regularly with Luke Morley and Peter Shoulder's current band The Union, as well as with Tyketto and Eagles tribute act, The Ultimate Eagles.

References

External links
Big Red Recorders – MySpace page of Chris Childs studio

English bass guitarists
English male guitarists
Male bass guitarists
People from Writtle
1959 births
Living people
Thunder (band) members